The United States Air Force's 659th Intelligence, Surveillance and Reconnaissance Group (659 ISRG) is an intelligence unit located at Fort George G. Meade, Maryland.

Mission
The mission of the 659 ISRG is to provide direct ISR support to the Sixteenth Air Force, which contributes to United States Cyber Command's mission.  Squadron personnel focus on digital network exploitation analysis and digital network intelligence, and provide support to the National Security Agency.

History
The Air Force activated the 770th ISR Group (P) as a provisional group in October 2009 to evaluate providing ISR support to the Twenty-Fourth Air Force.  The 770th ISR Group (P) was inactivated with the activation of the 659 ISRG.

Assignments

Major Command
 Air Combat Command (29 Sep 2014–present)

Numbered Air Force/Field Operating Agency
Air Force Intelligence, Surveillance and Reconnaissance Agency (8 Sep 2010 – 28 Sep 2014)
25th Air Force (29 Sep 2014–10 Oct 2019)
16th Air Force (11 Oct 2019-Present)

Wings/Groups
70th ISR Wing (8 Sep 2010 – present)

Squadrons assigned
 5th Intelligence Squadron - Fort Gordon, GA
 7th Intelligence Squadron - Fort George G. Meade, MD
 35th Intelligence Squadron - Joint Base San Antonio-Lackand, TX
 37th Intelligence Squadron - Joint Base Pearl Harbor–Hickam, HI

Bases stationed
 Fort George G. Meade, MD (8 Sep 2010 – present)

References

External links
 Air Combat Command
 25th Air Force
 70th ISR Wing

Intelligence groups of the United States Air Force